Fontarnauite is a relatively recently described, rare sulfate, borate mineral with the chemical formula . It is found in an evaporite boron deposit. It coexists with other evaporite boron minerals, especially probertite. It is monoclinic, crystallizing in the space group P21/c.

It was named for Ramon Fontarnau i Griera, a materials scientist of the University of Barcelona.

References

Borate minerals
Sulfate minerals
Sodium minerals
Strontium minerals
Monoclinic minerals
Borate sulfates
Minerals in space group 14